Sağlık (literally "health") is a Turkish word and may refer to:
 Sağlık, Aksaray, a town in Aksaray Province, Turkey
 Sağlık, Çine, a village in Aydın Province, Turkey
 Sağlık, Meram, a town in Konya Province, Turkey
 Sağlık, Refahiye
 Sağlık, Silvan

People with the surname
 Enes Sağlık (born 1991), Belgian-Turkish footballer
 Erkan Sağlık (born 1985), Turkish footballer
 Mahir Sağlık (born 1983), Turkish footballer

Other
 Ellerine Sağlık, the debut album by Yalın, released in 2004

Turkish-language surnames